Big Bend Community College (BBCC) is a public community college in Moses Lake, Washington.

History 
Big Bend Community College was authorized by the Washington State Board of Education in 1961. Beginning fall quarter 1962 BBCC held its first regular classes at night in Moses Lake High School. The college opened classes in a new facility located a short distance southeast of the city of Moses Lake fall quarter 1963. In 1966, BBCC acquired a  tract of land on the former Larson Air Force Base, which became the permanent college campus for all programs in 1975.
The Washington State Legislature's Community College Act of 1967 designated BBCC as District 18 of the state community college system. The  district includes Grant and Adams counties and the Odessa School district in Lincoln County.

Campus 

Big Bend Community College's main campus is centrally located in the Columbia Basin of Washington state. The campus includes 25 buildings to facilitate more than 43 academic program areas.

Accreditation 
Big Bend Community College is accredited by the Northwest Commission on Colleges and Universities. Its transfer credits are normally accepted by other accredited colleges.

Athletics 
Big Bend Community College competes in the Northwest Athletic Conference (NWAC) as the Vikings, fielding men's teams for baseball, basketball, and wrestling. Women's teams for softball, basketball, volleyball, and wrestling.

Notable people 

 Nilsa Cruz-Perez, member of the New Jersey Senate
 Tom Dent, member of the Washington House of Representatives
 Margie Gannon, member of the Idaho House of Representatives

References

External links
 

Community colleges in Washington (state)
Educational institutions established in 1962
Universities and colleges accredited by the Northwest Commission on Colleges and Universities
Education in Grant County, Washington
Buildings and structures in Grant County, Washington
Moses Lake, Washington
1962 establishments in Washington (state)